B.K. Birla Institute of Engineering & Technology (BKBIET) is an engineering college affiliated to Bikaner Technical University (earlier affiliated to Rajasthan Technical University) and located in Pilani, Rajasthan, India. It was founded in 2007 by Krishnarpan Charity Trust, with Late Basant Kumar Birla as chairman.

Description
BKBIET, Pilani is part of Shree Krishnarpan Charity Trust, under the chairmanship of Syt. Basant Kumarji Birla. The Institute was established in 2007. It is approved by AICTE, New Delhi and affiliated to Bikaner Technical University, Kota.

Undergraduate programs
BKBIET offers a Bachelor of Technology in six areas:
 Computer Science Engineering
 Information Technology
 Electrical Engineering
 Electronics & Communication Engineering
 Mechanical Engineering
 Artificial Intelligence
Data Science(New 2021 Onwards)

Campus
The Institute is located near CSIR-CEERI and BITS Pilani campus.

Residential and dining facilities
The campus contains six hostels: four for boys and two for girls. All told, these modern-looking hostels span 31,200 square feet and contain triple, double, and single rooms. Although in a separate building, the mess is attached to the hostel buildings. A common room sits above the mess and contains games like chess, carom and table tennis. Students may also dine at the campus "robo canteen".

International collaboration

BKBIET International Relations Division
BKBIET International Relations Division (BIRD) was established on May 14, 2011. The objective of the BIRD is to encourage the students of the institute to embrace the global education. The division motivates students to go on internships, look into avenues of research and management after the completion of the bachelor's degree, and serves as a pool of information to all those who are interested in doing higher studies abroad. The majority of the students who took internships went to universities of France, most prominently University of Nantes, University d’Haute Alsace, and IUT Angoulême. The measure of cooperation is exhibited by the fact that an unprecedented Joint Masters Programme is being set up between Polytech Nantes and BKBIET Pilani. The students are highly motivated to take up higher education abroad in a scene where their peers in other institutes are trying to settle in for a job. The students have been awarded various scholarships. Counselling, visas, scholarships and other help have always been available for the students of BKBIET through BIRD.

International Journal of Microwave and Optical Technology (IJMOT)
The International Journal of Microwave and Optical Technology (IJMOT) provides a common platform to disseminate original research work and invited tutorials in the area of microwave technology, microwave photonics and optical technology. It is a completely online journal. Manuscripts are solicited to cover original theoretical and /or experimental work in the areas of microwave technology, optical communications and the emerging area of microwave photonics. IJMOT is now indexed by SCOPUS, Google, EI-Compendex, EBSCO, and Media Finder.

See also
 List of universities in India
 List of institutions of higher education in India
 Education in India

References

External links
 

Engineering colleges in Rajasthan
Education in Jhunjhunu district
Educational institutions established in 2007
2007 establishments in Rajasthan